Bilaspur Junction railway station (station code BSP), located in the Indian state of Chhattisgarh, serves Bilaspur in Bilaspur district.

History
The railway station came up in 1889 with the opening of Rajnandgaon to Bilaspur extension of erstwhile Nagpur Chhattisgarh Railway taken over by Bengal Nagpur Railway and construction of the Nagpur–Asansol main line of Bengal Nagpur Railway, which opened in 1891. The station building was constructed in 1890. It became a station on the crosscountry Howrah–Nagpur–Mumbai line in 1900.

Electrification
The Rourkela–Bilaspur section was electrified in 1969–70 while Bilaspur–Nagpur in 1976–77 and Bilaspur–Katni in 1981.

Zonal HQ
Bilaspur is headquarters of South East Central Railway.

Busy station
Bilaspur is amongst the top hundred booking stations of Indian Railway. as about 340 passenger trains and goods trains passes every day.

Important trains
 12441/ Bilaspur Rajdhani Express
 12130/ Azad Hind Express
 18237/ Chhattisgarh Express
 12823/ Chhattisgarh Sampark Kranti Superfast Express
 12102/ Jnaneswari Express
 12810/ Howrah–Mumbai Mail
 12855/ Bilaspur–Itwari Intercity Superfast Express
 18029/ Shalimar–Lokmanya Tilak Terminus Express
 22815/ Ernakulam–Bilaspur Express
 12851/ Bilaspur–Chennai Central Superfast Express
 22619/ Tirunelveli–Bilaspur Express
For other train details please visit Indian Railway web site indianrail.gov.in.

Achievements
Bilaspur Junction railway station has many achievements:
 Bilaspur Junction is third-cleanest railway station and cleanest zonal headquarter railway station of India. (Survey 2015–16)
 Here is fifth-longest railway platform in Bilaspur Junction.

References

External links

Railway stations in Bilaspur district, Chhattisgarh
Railway junction stations in Chhattisgarh
Bilaspur railway division
Transport in Bilaspur, Chhattisgarh
Railway stations in India opened in 1889
1889 establishments in British India